SB-699551 is a drug which was the first compound developed to act as a selective antagonist for the serotonin receptor 5-HT5A, with selectivity of around 100x over other serotonin receptor subtypes. Multiple therapeutic roles have been suggested for 5-HT5A ligands due to the presence of this receptor in several areas of the brain, but research is still at an early stage, In animal studies, SB-699551 was found to block cue-mediated responding to LSD, again suggesting an antipsychotic type of activity. It also reduces the viability of certain types of cancer cells in vitro, suggesting the 5-HT5A receptor as a possible target for novel chemotherapy drugs.

References 

5-HT5 antagonists
Dimethylamino compounds
Carboxamides
Cyclopentanes